The Hosford yield criterion is a function that is used to determine whether a material has undergone plastic yielding under the action of stress.

Hosford yield criterion for isotropic plasticity 

The Hosford yield criterion for isotropic materials is a generalization of the von Mises yield criterion.  It has the form

Alternatively, the yield criterion may be written as

This expression has the form of an Lp norm which is defined as

When , the we get the L∞ norm, 
.  Comparing this with the Hosford criterion
indicates that if n = ∞, we have

This is identical to the Tresca yield criterion.

Therefore, when n = 1 or n goes to infinity the Hosford criterion reduces to the Tresca yield criterion. When n = 2 the Hosford criterion reduces to the von Mises yield criterion.

Note that the exponent n does not need to be an integer.

Hosford yield criterion for plane stress 
For the practically important situation of plane stress, the Hosford yield criterion takes the form

A plot of the yield locus in plane stress for various values of the exponent  is shown in the adjacent figure.

Logan-Hosford yield criterion for anisotropic plasticity 

The Logan-Hosford yield criterion for anisotropic plasticity is similar to Hill's generalized yield criterion and has the form

where F,G,H are constants,  are the principal stresses, and the exponent n depends on the type of crystal (bcc, fcc, hcp, etc.) and has a value much greater than 2.

Though the form is similar to Hill's generalized yield criterion, the exponent n is independent of the R-value unlike the Hill's criterion.

Logan-Hosford criterion in plane stress 
Under plane stress conditions, the Logan-Hosford criterion can be expressed as

For a derivation of this relation see Hill's yield criteria for plane stress. A plot of the yield locus for the anisotropic Hosford criterion is shown in the adjacent figure. For values of  that are less than 2, the yield locus exhibits corners and such values are not recommended.

References

See also 
Yield surface
Yield (engineering)
Plasticity (physics)
Stress (physics)

Plasticity (physics)
Solid mechanics
Mechanics
Yield criteria